The Vampire Diaries, an American supernatural drama, was renewed for an eighth and final season by The CW on March 11, 2016. On July 23, 2016, The CW announced that the upcoming season would be the series' last and would consist of 16 episodes. The season premiered on October 21, 2016, and concluded on March 10, 2017.

Cast

Main
 Paul Wesley as Stefan Salvatore
 Ian Somerhalder as Damon Salvatore
 Kat Graham as Bonnie Bennett
 Candice King as Caroline Forbes
 Zach Roerig as Matt Donovan
 Matt Davis as Alaric Saltzman
 Michael Malarkey as Enzo St. John

Recurring
 Kristen Gutoskie as Seline
 Demetrius Bridges as Dorian Williams
 Allison Scagliotti as Georgie Dowling
 Nathalie Kelley as Sybil
 Lily Rose Mumford as Josie Saltzman
 Tierney Mumford as Lizzie Saltzman
 Wolé Parks as Cade
 Joel Gretsch as Peter Maxwell
 Sammi Hanratty as Violet Fell
 Kayla Ewell as Vicki Donovan
 Reece Odum as Karen

Special guest
 Michael Trevino as Tyler Lockwood
 Chris Wood as Kai Parker

Special appearance
 Steven R. McQueen as Jeremy Gilbert
 Sara Canning as Jenna Sommers
 Marguerite MacIntyre as Liz Forbes
 David Anders as John Gilbert
 Jodi Lyn O'Keefe as Jo Laughlin
 Jasmine Guy as Sheila Bennett
 Arielle Kebbel as Lexi Branson
 Jaz Sinclair as Beatrice Bennett
 Natashia Williams as Lucy Bennett

Guest
 Aisha Duran as Virginia St. John
 Tristin Mays as Sarah Nelson
 Alexandra Chando as Tara
 Evan Gamble as Henry Wattles
 Persia White as Abby Bennett Wilson
 Melinda Clarke as Kelly Donovan
 Nina Dobrev as Katherine Pierce / Elena Gilbert

Episodes

Production 
Filming for the season began on July 20, 2016. It was announced on July 23, 2016, that season 8 of The Vampire Diaries would be the series' last and co-creater Kevin Williamson would return as a showrunner. Filming for the season ended on February 8, 2017.

Casting 
On January 26, 2017, it was announced that Nina Dobrev would return as Elena Gilbert in the series finale. At the end of the episode, "It's Been a Hell of a Ride" on February 24, 2017, it was revealed that Dobrev would reprise her role of Katherine Pierce as well.

Reception

Critical response
Based on 16 reviews, the eighth season holds a 100% on Rotten Tomatoes with an average rating of 8 out of 10. The site's critics' consensus reads, "Even into its eighth season, The Vampire Diaries exceeds genre expectations while still servicing fans with Nina Dobrev's return."

Ratings

References

External links

8
2016 American television seasons
2017 American television seasons